Ramsund is a village in Tjeldsund Municipality in Troms og Finnmark county, Norway. The village is located on the eastern shore of the Ramsundet strait, just south of the Ramsund Bridge.

Ramsund Chapel is located in this village. The main Norwegian Naval base for the north is located south of the village and is the home for the Marinejegerkommandoen unit.

References

External links 
  
 Official Navy Base website 

Tjeldsund
Villages in Troms
Populated places of Arctic Norway